Unwin may refer to:

People

Given name
Unwin Brown, British drummer with the Trees

Surname
Alan Unwin, Canadian politician
Antony Unwin (b. 1952), statistician and software developer
Ben Unwin (1977–2019), Australian actor
Edward Unwin (1864–1950), recipient of the Victoria Cross
Esmond Unwin Butler (1922–1989), Canadian diplomat
George Unwin (1913–2006), RAF wing commander
Howard Unwin Moffat (1869–1951), Rhodesian premier
J. D. Unwin (1895–1936), British ethnologist 
Jim Unwin (1912–2003), English rugby union international
Joseph Unwin (1892–1987), Canadian politician
Nora S. Unwin (1907–1982), children's illustrator
Paul Unwin (cricketer) (b. 1967), New Zealand cricketer
Paul Unwin (film director) (b. 1957), UK-based film and television director
Raymond Unwin (1863–1940), English planner
Rayner Unwin (1925–2000), son of publisher, Stanley Unwin
Robert Unwin Harwood (1798–1863), Canadian businessman and political figure
Stanley Unwin (comedian) (1911–2002), South African born comedian
Sir Stanley Unwin (publisher) (1884–1968), nephew of Thomas Fisher Unwin
Stephen Unwin (b. 1959), English theatre director
Thomas Fisher Unwin (1848–1935), founder of publisher T. Fisher Unwin
William Unwin (1838–1933), mechanical engineer

Fiction
Characters from the British TV soap opera Coronation Street
Bev Unwin
Shelley Unwin
Gary "Eggsy" Unwin, a fictional character and protagonist from the Kingsman film franchise and comic novel of the same name.
The surname “Unwin” is mentioned in reference to an alphabetical roster of orphans’ names in Charles Dickens’ novel, “Oliver Twist”.

Other

Allen & Unwin, publishing house
T. Fisher Unwin, publishing house
Unwins, a chain of off-licenses
Unwin Sowter (1839 - 1910), English cricketer